Michael C. Mentel is a Judge of Ohio's Tenth District Court of Appeals.

Mentel is a past President of the Columbus City Council in Ohio.  He was also the chair of the Council's Rules and References Committee. Mentel was a member of the Council from January 1999 until his resignation in December 2010.

Mentel graduated from Bishop Ready High School, Capital University and Capital University Law School.  He works as an attorney in a private practice that focuses on environmental law.

Mentel ran for election for judge of the Ohio Tenth District Court of Appeals and won in the general election on November 3, 2020.

References

External links
 Columbus City Council members

Lawyers from Columbus, Ohio
Living people
Columbus City Council members
Capital University Law School alumni
Year of birth missing (living people)
21st-century American judges
Judges of the Ohio District Courts of Appeals
Ohio Democrats